Alpachiri is a village and rural locality (municipality) in La Pampa Province in Argentina.

Location
Alpachiri is located 50 km to the north-east of the city of Guatraché

Population
Alpachiri had 1,797 inhabitants (INDEC, 2001), which represented a decrease of 3.3% from the 1,859 inhabitants recorded in the previous census (INDEC, 1991).

References

Populated places in La Pampa Province